The Grayson House was a historic plantation house located in Franklin Parish, Louisiana, about  south of Fort Necessity.

Built in c.1836 in Federal style by Wiley B. Grayson, it was originally a galleried dogtrot structure two rooms deep with four chimneys set against the exteriors of side walls. The house went under a major renovation in 1910, with the open dogtrot passage being enclosed, an outbuilding being moved and connected to the west side of the house, a rear kitchen being built and the front and rear dormers being added.

The house was listed on the National Register of Historic Places on October 27, 1982. It has been destroyed some time after its enlistment.

See also
National Register of Historic Places listings in Franklin Parish, Louisiana

References

Houses on the National Register of Historic Places in Louisiana
Federal architecture in Louisiana
Houses completed in 1836
Franklin Parish, Louisiana